The Deviants (formerly The Social Deviants) were an English rock band originally active from late 1966 to 1969, but later used as a vehicle for the musical work of writer Mick Farren until his death in 2013.

Farren has stated that The Deviants were originally a community band which "did things every now and then—it was a total assault thing with a great deal of inter-relation and interdependence". Musically, Mick Farren described that they were influenced by The Who, Charles Mingus, Velvet Underground, and Frank Zappa.

History

1960s
The Social Deviants were founded by singer/writer Mick Farren in late 1966 out of the Ladbroke Grove UK Underground community, featuring Pete Munro on bass, Clive Muldoon on guitar, Mike Robinson on guitar, and Benny (surname unknown) on drums. This group played at UFO in Tottenham Court Road and opened the Alexandra Palace Love-In festival. Shortly thereafter Benny (surname unknown) was replaced by Phil Mari on drums for a few gigs. In the early months of 1967 Phil Mari left the band and was replaced by Russell Hunter (born 26 April 1946, Woking, Surrey) as permanent drummer in the group. The band then shortened their name to "The Deviants" after Pete Munro, Clive Muldoon, and Mike Robinson all left the group and were replaced by Cord Rees on bass and Sid Bishop on guitar (born Ian Bishop, 17 December 1946, Balham, South West London). With the financial backing of Nigel Samuel, the 21-year-old son of a millionaire, whom Farren had befriended, the group independently recorded their debut album Ptooff!, selling copies through the UK Underground press before it was picked up by Decca Records. This LP had been reissued on Drop Out Records (1992), Captain Trip Records (2004), Esoteric Recordings (2009), and Angel Air Records (2013); additionally, a 10" EP with excerpts from Ptooff!! was released on Alive/Total Energy Records (1996) under the name Social Deviants.

Rees left the band in June 1967 to be replaced by Farren's flatmate Duncan Sanderson (born Stuart Duncan Sanderson, 31 December 1948, in Carlisle, Cumbria) and the band released a second album Disposable through the independent label Stable Records.

When Bishop married and left the band, Farren recruited Canadian guitarist Paul Rudolph (born Paul Fraser Rudolph, 14 June 1947, in Vancouver, British Columbia, Canada) at the suggestion of Jamie Mandelkau. This band recorded and released the album The Deviants 3 through Transatlantic Records.

During a tour of North America's west coast the relationship between Farren and the musicians became personally and musically strained, and the band decided to continue without Farren, who returned to England, where he teamed up with ex-Pretty Things drummer Twink (born John Charles Alder, 29 November 1944, in Colchester, Essex) and Steve Peregrin Took (born Stephen Ross Porter, 28 July 1949, in Eltham, South East London) to record the album Mona – The Carnivorous Circus, an album interspersed with interviews with Took and a member of the U.K Hells Angels  before concentrating on music journalism. The three remaining musicians - Rudolph, Sanderson and Hunter - continued in North America for some months occasionally playing gigs there under the Deviants name, before returning to England early in 1970, and teaming up with Twink to form the Pink Fairies.

1970s onwards
In the mid-1970s, Farren was offered a one-off deal by Stiff Records to record an EP, Screwed Up, which was released under the name Mick Farren and the Deviants. The musicians on this record included Rudolph, former Pink Fairies/Motörhead guitarist Larry Wallis, former Warsaw Pakt guitarist Andy Colquhoun and former Hawkwind drummer Alan Powell. This band, without Rudolph, went on to record the album Vampires Stole My Lunch Money and the non-album single "Broken Statue", both credited to Mick Farren rather than The Deviants.

At the end of the 1970s Farren again concentrated on his writing and relocated to New York City. He would resurrect The Deviants name for occasional live performances, such as in February 1984 when he teamed up with Wayne Kramer and Wallis' band which featured Sanderson and drummer George Butler. This set was released as Human Garbage. In 2002, a new line-up of the band (featuring bassist Doug Lunn, drummer Ric Parnell and vocalist Michael Simmons) released Dr. Crow.

Farren then continued to perform and record sporadically under the name The Deviants, using a pool of musicians which include Andy Colquhoun and former Blodwyn Pig saxophonist Jack Lancaster. Eating Jello With A Heated Fork was released in 1996, credited to Deviants IXVI, followed by 2002's Dr Crow.

On 25 June 2011, after returning to live in the UK, Farren performed on the 'Spirit of 71' stage at Glastonbury Festival with 'The Last Men Standing'. The band included Andy Colquhoun and the Deviants late-1960s rhythm section of Sanderson and Hunter.

During a rare performance by The Deviants at The Borderline in Central London on 27 July 2013, Farren collapsed on stage. He died later in hospital.

Discography

Studio albums

Live albums

Compilation albums

Extended Plays

Singles

Timeline

Bibliography

References

External links
 Funtopia
 Deviant History UHCK
 Deviants Discography
 Larry Wallis’s review of ‘’Dr Crow’’
 Mick Farren and the Deviants

Acid rock music groups
Musical groups from London
English psychedelic rock music groups
Protopunk groups
Sire Records artists
Transatlantic Records artists
Freak scene musicians